Shanghai Children's Medical Center (SCMC) is a children's hospital in Shanghai, China, with the rank of "Grade 3, Class A", the highest level of hospital classification in China. It is a university hospital affiliated to the School of Medicine, Shanghai Jiao Tong University.  The hospital is located next to the east part of Renji Hospital .

The SCMC program was first designed in 1989 with the cooperation of Shanghai Municipal People's Government and Project HOPE. Xinhua Hospital was in charge of the preparing stage of SCMC. The hospital was founded in 1998. Mrs. Hillary Clinton, then First Lady of the United States, and Ms. Zuo Huanchen, former Vice Mayor of Shanghai, attended the opening ceremony.

See also 

 Shanghai Jiao Tong University School of Medicine
 Shanghai Children's Hospital
 International Peace Maternity and Child Health Hospital, China Welfare Institute
 Children's Hospital of Fudan University
 List of children's hospitals

References 

 Introduction of Xinhua Hospital

External links 
 The Official Website of SCMC
 Introduction of SCMC

Hospitals established in 1998
Teaching hospitals in Shanghai
Children's hospitals in China
1989 establishments in China
Shanghai Jiao Tong University